Norbert Csernyánszki (born 1 February 1976 in Veszprém) is a retired Hungarian football player.

Honours
Hungarian League: 2004–05, 2005–06, 2006–07
Named in the Hungarian National Championship I all-star team (nemzetisport.hu):  2010–11

References
paksi SE Official Website
Profile at HLSZ.hu

1976 births
Living people
People from Veszprém
Hungarian footballers
Association football goalkeepers
Veszprém LC footballers
Gázszer FC footballers
BFC Siófok players
Debreceni VSC players
Paksi FC players
Nemzeti Bajnokság I players
Sportspeople from Veszprém County